Gregory Zuerlein (born December 27, 1987), nicknamed "Greg the Leg" and "Legatron", is an American football placekicker for the New York Jets of the National Football League (NFL). A native of Lincoln, Nebraska, he played college football at Nebraska-Omaha and Missouri Western. He previously played for the Los Angeles Rams and the Dallas Cowboys.

Early years
Zuerlein was born in Lincoln, Nebraska, and graduated from Lincoln Pius X in 2006. In 2004, Zuerlein set a Nebraska state record for field goals in a season, converting 12-of-16 attempts with a long of 52 yards. His successful play would earn him Nebraska All-State and All-Class honors as a junior and senior.

College career
Zuerlein attended the University of Nebraska Omaha (UNO) for three seasons but sat out the 2010 season with a hip injury. Zuerlein set the UNO school record of 61 consecutive PATs while converting 19 of 26 field goal attempts.

UNO canceled its football program in 2011, and he moved to another Mid-America Intercollegiate Athletics Association school, Missouri Western State University, in 2011. There, he set an NCAA Division II record of 21 consecutive field goals, nine of which were beyond 50 yards, including two from 58 yards. He had a .952 field goal percentage, completing 23 of 24 attempts, which was the highest of any NCAA player in any division with 12 or more attempts in 2011, as he averaged 10.7 points per game.

Professional career

St. Louis/Los Angeles Rams 
Zuerlein was drafted by the St. Louis Rams in the sixth round (171st overall) of the 2012 NFL Draft.  He was the first non-Football Bowl Subdivision kicker to be drafted since Stephen Gostkowski in 2006, and the first below the Division I Football Bowl Subdivision since Paul Ernster in 2005. The Rams cut their primary kicker Josh Brown, who was in the final year of his $14.5 million five-year deal, the same weekend they drafted Zuerlein.

2012: Rookie season

Zuerlein made his NFL debut in the season opener against the Detroit Lions and converted two extra point attempts and three field goal attempts in the 27–23 loss. In Week 3, against the Chicago Bears, he made a 56-yard field goal, the longest at Soldier Field. In Week 4, he hit a 60-yard field goal against the Seattle Seahawks, which beat the franchise record of 58 yards, set by Zuerlein earlier in the same game. The kick broke Jeff Wilkins' 14-year record. He became the first player in NFL history to make a 60-yard field goal and a 50-plus yarder in the same game. He was named NFC Special Teams Player of the Week for his effort against the Seahawks. In Week 6, Zuerlein missed three field goals wide left, the first two from 37 and 52 yards, and the final one at 66 yards to tie the game against the Miami Dolphins. In Week 13, Zuerlein made a 54-yard field goal with 26 seconds remaining in overtime to give the Rams a 16–13 victory over the San Francisco 49ers at the Edward Jones Dome. It was the second longest successful field goal in NFL overtime history, three yards short of the NFL overtime record, which is held by Sebastian Janikowski. He earned another NFC Special Teams player of the Week award for his game against the 49ers. In 2012, he attempted 13 field goals of 50 yards or longer, converting seven. Overall, in his rookie season, he converted all 26 extra point attempts and 23 of 31 field goal attempts.

2013 season
Zuerlein started the 2013 season off converting all four field goal attempts and one extra point attempt in the 27–24 victory over the Arizona Cardinals. The 13 points he scored in the season opener was his highest scoring in one game on the season. Overall, he was a reliable kicker when called upon, converting all 34 extra point attempts and 26 of 28 field goal attempts in the 2013 season as the Rams finished with a 7–9 record.

2014 season
In Week 2, Zuerlein converted four field goal attempts and one extra point to help provide the difference in the 19–17 victory over the Tampa Bay Buccaneers. In Week 11, against the Denver Broncos, he converted all five field goal attempts and one extra point in the 22–7 victory. He earned NFC Special Teams Player of the Week for the third time in his career. Overall, he finished the 2014 season converting 34 of 35 extra points and 24 of 30 field goal attempts.

2015 season
In the 2015 season opener against the Seattle Seahawks, Zuerlein converted all four extra point attempts and both field goal attempts in the 34–31 overtime victory. In Week 5, against the Green Bay Packers, he converted one of four field goal attempts in the 24–10 loss, the first time since his rookie season that he missed three in a single game. In Week 9, against the Minnesota Vikings, he converted four of five field goal attempts for a season-high 12 points scored in the 21–18 loss. Zuerlein missed two games due to a groin injury. Overall, he finished the 2015 season with 26 of 28 extra points converted and 20 of 30 field goals converted.

2016 season

The Rams made the decision to move from St. Louis to Los Angeles prior to the 2016 season. On April 15, 2016, Zuerlein signed a one-year contract to return to the Los Angeles Rams. After the Rams were shut out against the San Francisco 49ers in Week 1, Zuerlein provided all the scoring in the 9–3 victory over the Seattle Seahawks in Week 2. In Week 5, against the Buffalo Bills, he converted all four field goal attempts and one extra point in the 30–19 loss. Overall, he finished the 2016 season converting all 23 extra point attempts and 19 of 22 field goal attempts. The Rams' offense did not provide a lot of opportunities for Zuerlein compared to the past and he scored a career-low 80 points on the 4–12 season. Head coach Jeff Fisher was fired before the season ended.

2017 season
Before the 2017 season, Sean McVay was hired as the new coach of the Los Angeles Rams. On March 14, 2017, Zuerlein signed a three-year contract extension with the Rams.

On September 10, 2017, in the season opener against the Indianapolis Colts, Zuerlein converted three field goals and five extra points in a 46–9 home victory. He tied with Oakland Raiders' kicker Giorgio Tavecchio for the most points scored by a kicker in Week 1 with 14. On October 1, 2017, Zuerlein broke the Rams record for the most field goals in a game going 7 for 7 (surpassing Jeff Wilkins in 2006) against the Dallas Cowboys in the Rams 35–30 upset win, earning him NFC Special Teams Player of the Week for the fourth time in his career. On November 2, 2017, Zuerlein received the NFC Special Teams Player of the Month award for his strong performances in October. In Week 10, Zuerlein converted all four field goals, including a 50-yarder in a 33–7 win over the Houston Texans, earning him NFC Special Teams Player of the Week for the second time in the 2017 season. On December 20, 2017, Zuerlein was placed on injured reserve due to a back injury. This news came a day after it was announced the Zuerlein was named to his first Pro Bowl. In addition, he earned NFC Special Teams Player of the Month for November. He was later named as a First-team All-Pro. He finished the season leading the league in scoring with 158 points and 11.3 points per game.

2018 season
In the 2018 season opener, Zuerlein converted all three extra point attempts and converted four of five field goal attempts, including a 55-yarder in a 33–13 win over the Oakland Raiders on Monday Night Football, earning him NFC Special Teams Player of the Week for the sixth time in his career. He suffered a groin injury in pregame warmups before the Week 2 game against the Arizona Cardinals. He returned to action in Week 7 against the San Francisco 49ers, converting four extra point attempts and three field goal attempts in the 39–10 victory. In Week 11, against the Kansas City Chiefs on Monday Night Football, he converted six of seven extra point attempts and three field goal attempts in the historic 54–51 victory. In the regular season finale against the San Francisco 49ers, he converted all six extra point attempts and both field goal attempts in the 48–32 victory. Overall, he finished the 2018 season converting 35 of 36 extra point attempts and 27 of 31 field goal attempts. The Rams won the NFC West and earned the #2-seed in the NFC Playoffs.

In the Divisional Round against the Dallas Cowboys, he converted three extra-point attempts and three of four field-goal attempts in the 30–22 victory. In the 2019 NFC Championship Game against the New Orleans Saints, Zuerlein was instrumental in the Rams' overtime win, hitting all four of his field-goal attempts. This included a 48-yard field goal near the end of regulation to send the game into overtime, and then a 57-yard field goal to win the game in sudden death overtime, sending his team to the Super Bowl LIII. The winning kick tied the record for the longest successful field goal in NFL overtime history. In Super Bowl LIII against the New England Patriots, Zuerlein made a 53-yard field goal late in the third quarter to score the first Rams’ points and tie the game at 3–3. With 8 seconds left in the game and his team down 13–3, he missed a 48-yard field goal that would’ve set up his team for a desperation attempt to tie or win the game with an ensuing onside kick recovery and a Hail Mary pass. The Rams lost 13–3.

2019 season
In the 2019 season, Zuerlein converted 24 of 33 field goal attempts and all 42 extra point attempts.

Dallas Cowboys
On March 30, 2020, the Dallas Cowboys signed Zuerlein to a three-year, $7.5 million contract. The signing reunited him with former Rams special teams coordinator John Fassel.

2020 season
On September 20, 2020, Zuerlein capped off a historic comeback for the Dallas Cowboys over the Atlanta Falcons in just his second game with them by kicking the game-winning 46 yard field goal to win it 40–39. The Cowboys were down 20–0 at the end of the first quarter and 29–10 at halftime. Moments before the game-winning drive, Zuerlein kicked an onside kick, which the Cowboys recovered giving them a chance to win the game. Overall, in the 2020 season, Zuerlein converted 34 of a career-high 41 field goal attempts and went 33-of-36 on extra point attempts.

2021 season
On September 9, 2021, Zuerlein made three field goals, but missed two fields goals and an extra point, including a 60-yard field goal near the end of the first half in a 31–29 loss to the Tampa Bay Buccaneers. In Week 16, against the Washington Football Team, he converted a career-high eight extra point attempts. Overall, in the 2021 season, Zuerlein was 29–of–35 on field goal attempts and 42–of–48 on extra-point attempts.

On March 11, 2022, Zuerlein was released by the Cowboys.

New York Jets
On March 26, 2022, Zuerlein signed a one-year contract with the New York Jets.

On March 16, 2023,  Zuerlein re-signed with the Jets on another one-year contract.

NFL career statistics

Regular season

NFL records and honors
 First-team All-Pro - 2017
 NFC Special Teams Player of the Week – (2012 - Week 4, Week 13, 2014 - Week 11; 2017 - Week 4, Week 10; 2018 - Week 1)
 NFC Special Teams Player of the Month – October (2017), November (2017)
 Longest field goal in Rams history: 61 yards
 Most 50-yard field goals attempted in a season: 13 (2012)
 First player in NFL history to make a 60-yard field goal and a 50-plus-yard field goal in one game
 First player in NFL history to make two field goals of 58-plus yards in one game
 Longest field goal in the first quarter: 58 yards (tied with Nick Lowery)
 Longest field goal in the third quarter: 60 yards
 Rams record for most field goals in one game: 7 (surpassed Jeff Wilkins)
 Most field goals per game, season – 2.79 (39 field goals/14 games), (2017)
 Most games in a season with 14-plus points – 7 (2017)

Personal life
Zuerlein and his wife Megan are devout Catholics, and have four children together.

For his kicking ability, Zuerlein has been nicknamed "The Leg” (Commonly referred to as Greg The Leg) and "Legatron” since his rookie season.

References

External links

 
 New York Jets bio
 Nebraska-Omaha Mavericks bio
 Missouri Western State Griffons bio

1987 births
Living people
American Roman Catholics
American football placekickers
Catholics from Nebraska
Dallas Cowboys players
Los Angeles Rams players
Missouri Western Griffons football players
National Conference Pro Bowl players
Nebraska–Omaha Mavericks football players
Players of American football from Nebraska
Sportspeople from Lincoln, Nebraska
St. Louis Rams players
New York Jets players